Temple of Peace may refer to:

Temple of Peace, Cardiff, a non-religious civic building  in the civic centre of Cardiff, Wales
Temple of Peace, Rome, also known as Forum of Vespasian, one of the imperial forums
Temple of Peace (Toowong Cemetery), Brisbane, Queensland, Australia, a pacifist war memorial
Temple for Peace, a construction project of the Buddhist congregation Vajradhara-Ling in Normandy.